Catherine Vidal, born November 11, 1976, is a Quebec theater woman. Born to Chilean parents, she is an actress, puppeteer, singer and theatre director.

Theatre

Directed 

2008: Hypno de Simon Boudreault, mise en lecture, Festival du Jamais Lu
2008: Acné japonaise d'Étienne Lepage, Théâtre La Chapelle
2008: Walser, collage de textes de l’auteur Robert Walser
2009: Le Grand Cahier, Théâtre Prospero
2010: Joseph-la-tache, parcours ambulatoire Naissances du NTE à Espace Libre
2010: Amuleto, adaptation du roman du Chilien Roberto Bolaño, Théâtre de Quat'Sous
2012: Robin et Marion d'''Étienne Lepage, Théâtre I.N.K.
2013: Des couteaux dans les poules de David Harrower
2014: Avant la retraite de Thomas Bernhard
2015: Le Cœur en hiver, adaptation d'Étienne Lepage, Théâtre de l'Oeil
2016: Le miel est plus doux que le sang, théâtre Denise-Pelletier
2018: L’Idiot, de Dostoïevski (adaptation d'Étienne Lepage), Théâtre du Nouveau Monde
2018: Chapitres de la chute, comise en scène avec Marc Beaupré, Théâtre de Quat'Sous
2017: Je disparais, Théâtre Prospero
2019 : Les amoureux, théâtre Denise-Pelletier

 Acted 

1999: Code 99, dans le rôle de Lune, salle Fred-Barry
2001: Les Parapluies de Cherbourg, dans le rôle de Madeleine2002–2004: L’homme de la Mancha dans le rôle dAntonia2004–2006: Frères de sang dans le rôle de Mary2008: Lortie, à l'Espace Libre dans le chœur de trois femmes''

Honours 

2013: Recipient of the Critics' Prize from the prix de la Critique de l'Association québécoise des critiques de théâtre in the Montreal category for Des 'couteaux dans les poules' by David Harrower.

2020: First winner of the Jovette-Marchessault Prize for recognizing and promoting the contribution of women artists in the Montreal theater community.

References

External links 

Union des artistes (UDA)
Agence Ginette Achim Inc
Conservatoire d'art dramatique de Montréal: Catherine Vidal
Théâtres de rêve

Actresses from Quebec
Canadian theatre directors
Canadian people of Chilean descent